Konrád Verebélyi (born 11 December 1995) is a Hungarian professional footballer who plays for Kecskeméti TE.

Club statistics

Updated to games played as of 12 November 2014.

References
MLSZ 
HLSZ 

1995 births
Living people
People from Szentes
Hungarian footballers
Association football goalkeepers
Kecskeméti TE players
Nemzeti Bajnokság I players
Sportspeople from Csongrád-Csanád County